Rodolfo Richardson Smith (born 24 February 1963, in San Pedro Sula) is a retired Honduran football midfielder.

Club career
Smith began playing football in the Liga Nacional de Fútbol de Honduras with Marathón and Real España. He won the 1990–91 Honduran Liga Nacional title with Real España, scoring two goals in the final against Motagua.

In 1988, he moved abroad to play in Mexico with Correcaminos UAT. He would spend four seasons in the Mexican Primera División with Correcaminos and Club Universidad de Guadalajara. He also had a six-month spell with C.A. Peñarol in the Uruguayan Primera División.

International career
Richardson Smith made his debut for Honduras in the 1980s and has earned over 30 caps, scoring 11 goals. He has represented his country in 15 FIFA World Cup qualification matches and played at the 1995 UNCAF Nations Cup.

He played as a defender in his last match, covering for an injury to Luis Pineda, in a 3–1 FIFA World Cup qualification loss against Mexico on 6 November 1996. He lost the ball on the edge of the area which led to a Mexico goal, and fans attacked his house in San Pedro Sula with stones and fireworks after the match. The incident prompted him to announce his retirement from the national team.

International goals

Managerial career
After retiring as a player, Richardson Smith was assistant-coach at several clubs and became manager of Municipal Valencia for the 2004 Apertura season.
After spending time in the US as a youth team coach at Evergreen United and Juventus Strikers, he was named as possible manager of Deportes Savio in December 2012. As of August 2015, he was still working with children in the USA.

Honours and awards

Club
C.D. Real Espana
Liga Profesional de Honduras (2):  1990–91, 1993–94

C.D. Marathón
Liga Profesional de Honduras (1): 1985–86

Country
Honduras
Copa Centroamericana (1): 1995

References

External links

1963 births
Living people
People from San Pedro Sula
Association football midfielders
Honduran footballers
Honduras international footballers
C.D. Marathón players
Real C.D. España players
Correcaminos UAT footballers
Leones Negros UdeG footballers
Peñarol players
Liga MX players
Honduran expatriate footballers
Expatriate footballers in Mexico
Honduran expatriate sportspeople in Mexico
Expatriate footballers in Uruguay
Honduran expatriate sportspeople in Uruguay
Copa Centroamericana-winning players